Fuad Šašivarević (born 14 August 1968) is a Bosnian former professional footballer.

Club career
Šašivarević started his career in 1988, in the Yugoslav First League club Borac Banja Luka, where he played until 1992. Then he moved to the Croatian club HNK Rijeka from the coastal Adriatic Sea town with same name. In 1994, he moved to Croatia Zagreb (provisory name of Dinamo Zagreb in that period), but stayed there only six months. After playing in Segesta Sisak and NK Zagreb, he moved to Germany in 1998, where he played one season in the 2. Bundesliga club KFC Uerdingen 05, the former Bayer Uerdingen. Before his retirement, he played in his home-country clubs Jedinstvo Bihać and, the famous, FK Sarajevo.

International career
He was part of the Bosnia and Herzegovina national team squad in 1996 in the 1998 FIFA World Cup qualification, but only managed to make one appearance when he came on as a second half substitute for Admir Smajić in a September 1996 qualifier away against Greece.

Career statistics

Honours
Borac Banja Luka
Yugoslav Second League promotion: 1988–89
Mitropa Cup: 1992

HNK Rijeka
Croatian Cup final: 1993–94

Croatia Zagreb
Super Cup final: 1994

HNK Segesta
UEFA Intertoto Cup final: 1996

Sarajevo
Bosnia and Herzegovina Cup: 2001–02

References

External links
 

1968 births
Living people
Sportspeople from Banja Luka
Association football midfielders
Yugoslav footballers
Bosnia and Herzegovina footballers
Bosnia and Herzegovina international footballers
FK Borac Banja Luka players
HNK Rijeka players
GNK Dinamo Zagreb players
HNK Segesta players
NK Zagreb players
KFC Uerdingen 05 players
NK Jedinstvo Bihać players
FK Sarajevo players
Yugoslav Second League players
Yugoslav First League players
Croatian Football League players
2. Bundesliga players
Premier League of Bosnia and Herzegovina players
Bosnia and Herzegovina expatriate footballers
Expatriate footballers in Croatia
Bosnia and Herzegovina expatriate sportspeople in Croatia
Expatriate footballers in Germany
Bosnia and Herzegovina expatriate sportspeople in Germany
Bosniaks of Bosnia and Herzegovina